

Eolla, Bishop of Selsey, was the successor of Eadberht, and seems to have previously been Abbot of Selsey, as he witnessed a charter of Noðhelm together with Osric and Eadberht. He seems to have succeeded as bishop in either 716 or 717. His date of death is sometime between 716 and 731.

Citations

References

External links
 

Bishops of Selsey
8th-century English bishops